Josiah Brown (1816–1875) was an architect and civil and mill engineer of Fall River, Massachusetts. Among his major surviving projects are the Union Mill No. 1 (1859) and Border City Mill No. 2 (1873), both in Fall River.

Life and career
Josiah Brown was born July 10, 1816 in Smithfield, Rhode Island to Parley and Lucy (Southwick) Brown. Parley Brown was a methodist minister and was later a resident of East Douglas.

Brown received some education from his father, but he was mostly self-taught. He was a resident of Fall River by 1847, and was noted as an "Architect" in the first Fall River directory of 1853. In some of his early mill projects, Brown was assisted by the prominent machinist and mill superintendent William C. Davol. Brown was also the first employer of William C. Davol Jr., who would later establish the Davol Mills. From 1870 to 1875 William T. Henry, a graduate of the Massachusetts Institute of Technology, was in his office. Brown died July 30, 1875, at which point Henry succeeded to his practice.

The cause of death was Bright's disease.

In addition to his architectural and mill engineering work, Brown was involved in the Hoosac Tunnel project, serving as Chief Assistant Engineer under Thomas Doane, Chief Engineer from 1863 to 1867. He was also involved financially in several of his manufacturing projects. He was both organizer and initial president of the Montaup Mills, incorporated in 1871, and a director of the Robeson Mills, incorporated in 1866. At the time of his death, he was also a director of the Davol Mills, though it is not known if he was the architect.

He was the designer of several works listed on the United States National Register of Historic Places.

Works

Notes

References

Architects from Massachusetts
Architects from Rhode Island
Engineers from Massachusetts
Engineers from Rhode Island
1816 births
1875 deaths